Sinezona wanganellica is a species of minute sea snail, a marine gastropod mollusc or micromollusc in the family Scissurellidae, the little slit snails.

Distribution
This species occurs off New Zealand.

References

External links
 To World Register of Marine Species

Scissurellidae
Gastropods described in 2012